David Hartsuch was the Iowa State Senator from the 41st District. He served in the Iowa Senate from 2007–2011.

Hartsuch is an emergency department physician.  He has a bachelor's degree from Northern Illinois University and a medical degree from the University of Minnesota.

Hartsuch served on several committees in the Iowa Senate – the Human Resources committee; the Judiciary committee; the Local Government committee; and the Veterans Affairs committee.  He also serves on the Administration and Regulation Appropriations Subcommittee.

Hartsuch was elected in 2006 with 11,572 votes, defeating Democratic opponent Phyllis Thede by approximately 400 votes. 

Hartsuch was the Republican nominee for the U.S. House of Representatives in Iowa's 1st congressional district and lost to challenger Bruce Braley in 2008.

In 2010, Hartsuch was challenged in the Republican primary by Roby Smith.  On June 8, Hartsuch was defeated by under 200 votes.

In 2021, a letter from Hartsuch was published in the Quad City Times, leading some to question his rationality.

Electoral history

References

External links
 Senator David Hartsuch official Iowa Legislature site
 Senator David Hartsuch official Iowa General Assembly site
 Senator David Hartsuch at Iowa Senate Republican Caucus
 

Republican Party Iowa state senators
Living people
Northern Illinois University alumni
University of Minnesota Medical School alumni
American emergency physicians
Year of birth missing (living people)
Place of birth missing (living people)